Dinara Safina and Ágnes Szávay were the defending champions, but chose not to participate that year.

Anna-Lena Grönefeld and Vania King won in the final, 3–6, 7–5, 10–5, over Klaudia Jans and Alicja Rosolska.

Seeds

Draw

Draw

External links
Draw

2009 WTA Tour
Women's Doubles